Geet is a 1992 Indian Hindi film directed by Partho Ghosh. The film stars Avinash Wadhawan, Divya Bharti in lead roles. Shakti Kapoor, Laxmikant Berde play supporting roles.

Plot
The movie depicts Rajesh Tripathi (Avinash Wadhawan) living in poverty with his widowed father, Shivshankar. Rajesh left his village to study in Mumbai where he becomes a fan of singer and dancer, Neha (Divya Bharti) of whom he paints hoardings.

Neha's Manager, Hari Saxena (Shakti Kapoor) harasses her, but she refuses his advances and slaps him. Angered Hari then calls another singer to replace Neha and secretly puts vermilion (sindoor) in laddoos and gives them to Neha. In the middle of the show, Neha's voice becomes rough due to the vermillion. Her doctor deems her unable to continue singing.

Meanwhile, Rajesh is caught by the police and is unable to see Neha's performance. During the holidays, he returns home and gets a surprise when he finds that Neha has also re-located there.

Later on, Neha's car breaks down and Rajesh offers her a lift, but as they were driving, his car also breaks down in the middle of a forest. It begins to rain, so they find shelter in an old house where they were attacked by goons. Rajesh defeats the goons and Neha details the events to the police, but the police arrest Raju instead. He is later released after one of the goons confesses.

Neha starts a plan and sends Rajesh a love letter asking him to accompany her to an isolated shack. She locks him in the shack, which almost kills him. After this incident, Neha accepts his friendship and confides to him that she can never sing again as her vocal cords have been damaged beyond repair. Rajesh accepts the challenge and sets about to resurrect Neha's voice and her career, not knowing that both of them are targets of Hari, who has planned a bad ending for Neha and anyone who supports her.

Cast
Avinash Wadhawan as Rajesh Tripathi "Raja"
Divya Bharti as Neha
Shakti Kapoor as Hari Saxena
Laxmikant Berde as Pandey
Anil Dhawan as Doctor

Music
The music was composed by Bappi Lahiri and features vocals from Lata Mangeshkar, Mohammed Aziz, Kavita Krishnamurthy, Kumar Sanu, Alka Yagnik and Reshma. The songs "Aap Jo Mere Meet Na Hote" and "Prem Patra Aaya Hai Usne Bulaya Hai" were among the most popular.

References

External links

 Bollywood films of 1992 at the Internet Movie Database

1992 films
1990s Hindi-language films
Films scored by Bappi Lahiri
Films directed by Partho Ghosh